The post of Herb Strewer is an obsolete position in the United Kingdom dating back to the late 17th century.  The primary duty of the Herb Strewer was to distribute herbs and flowers (known as strewing herbs) throughout the royal apartments in order to mask less pleasant aromas (such as those from the Thames which at that time, before the construction of London's network of sewers, was particularly unhygienic).

The earliest recorded Herb Strewer was Bridget Rumney, who held the post from 1660 to 1671 and received an annual salary of £24, as well as two yards of superfine scarlet cloth for livery, as did all of her successors. The last full-time Herb Strewer was Mary Rayner, who served George III and two of his sons for a total of 43 years.

For his coronation in 1820, George IV appointed an old friend, Anne Fellowes, to the post, and she and her six attendants scattered flowers and herbs along the carpet of Westminster Abbey. She wore a traditional dress of white satin with a scarlet mantle trimmed with gold, a head dress of gold wheat intermixed with laurel and oak leaves, and bore a gold badge and chain.

Fellowes applied for the job again on the occasion of the coronation of William IV but, owing to cutbacks in the ceremony, her services were not required. Neither Queen Victoria nor any subsequent British monarchs have appointed a Herb Strewer for their coronations; however the Fellowes to this day claim this position for the eldest unmarried daughter of the family.

Thomas Tusser, a regular at the court of Henry VIII, lists twenty-one strewing herbs in his 1557 instructional poem, Five  Hundred Points of Good Husbandrie: basil, lemon balm, chamomile, costmary, cowslips, daisies, fennel, germander, hyssop, lavender, spike lavender, cotton lavender, marjoram, maudeline (sweet yarrow), pennyroyal, roses, red mints, sage, tansy, violets, and winter savory.

References

External links
Longevity Mountain Herbs

Obsolete occupations
Herbs